The walia ibex (Capra walie, Amharic: ዋልያ wālyā) is an vulnerable species of ibex. It is sometimes considered a subspecies of the Alpine ibex. Threats against the species include habitat loss, poaching, and restricted range; only about 500 individuals survived in the mountains of Ethiopia, concentrated in the Semien Mountains, largely due to past poaching and habitat depletion. If the population were to increase, the surrounding mountain habitat would be sufficient to sustain only 2,000 ibex. The adult walia ibex's only known wild predator is the hyena.  However, young ibex are often hunted by a variety of fox and cat species. The ibex are members of the goat family, and the walia ibex is the southernmost of today's ibexes. In the late 1990s, the walia ibex went from endangered to critically endangered due to the declining population. The walia ibex is also known as the Abyssinian ibex.
Given the small distribution range of the Walia ibex in its restricted mountain ecosystem, the presence of a large number of domestic goats may pose a serious threat that can directly affect the survival of the population.

Appearance 

These animals have a chocolate-brown to chestnut-brown coat coloration, greyish-brown muzzle, and a lighter grey in the eyes and legs. The belly and insides of the legs are white, and black and white patterns stretch upon the legs of these animals. These horns are used for dominance disputes between males. The males also have distinguished black beards. The length of the walia ibex beard varies with age. The older males have longer, thicker beards than the young ones . Females also have horns, but they are shorter and thinner. Females are smaller and lighter in color. The horns on both males and females are rigid. The overall size of the walia ibex is smaller and slimmer than the alpine ibex.

Behaviour 
Walia ibex live in herds ranging from five to 20 animals. However the older, more mature males are often more solitary, though they will remain within a short distance of the main herd most times and during the mating season and rejoin with the herd for breeding purposes. Breeding usually takes place during late fall and early winter. The following spring, the female will give birth to one or two offspring. A herd of walia ibex was noted to travel one half of a kilometer up to two kilometers per day.

Habitat and ecology 
Their habitats are mountain forests, subalpine grasslands, and scrub. They are grazers. Their diets include bushes, herbs, lichens, shrubs, grasses, and creepers. They are often seen standing on their hind legs to get to young shoots of giant heath. Walia ibex are most active in the morning and evening, and will rest in the sun on rock ledges. Males live in bachelor groups and females live in groups with their offspring. Mating season is at summit from March to May. Males compete for females by ramming their horns with amazing force. Gestation periods last 150–165 days. They reach sexual maturity at one year of age.

Threats 
This species is found only in the northern mountains of Ethiopia. Once widespread in the Semien Mountains, the numbers dropped during the 20th century. Only 200–250 animals were surviving in 1994–1996, but recently the population has somewhat increased to about 500 individuals in 2004. Habitat loss and hunting are major threats to the species. The encroaching settlement, livestock grazing, and cultivation are also big problems. Road construction is also fragmenting their habitat. The pressure and competition for natural resources have seen a constant increase in the past decades. Not only from livestock but also human agriculture and needs. This increase has affected the rate of interbreeding, survival, and expansion of the population. This impact has seen the endangerment level continue to rise and fewer and fewer resources are available for the native species to sustain their presence (Alemayehu et al, 2011). The most important stronghold for their survival is now the  sized Semien National Park which was established in 1969. The Walia ibex is considered to be vulnerable by the IUCN and needs further conservation measures to survive. Since no captive population is kept anywhere in the world, the IUCN recommends capturing a few individuals to form the nucleus of a captive breeding group.

References

External links
 https://web.archive.org/web/20070213095117/http://www.arkive.org/species/GES/mammals/Capra_walie/more_info.html
 http://animaldiversity.ummz.umich.edu/site/accounts/information/Capra_walie.html
 Nowak, Ronald M. Walkers Mammals of the World. N.p.: JHU Press, n.d
Alemayehu, K., Dessie, T., Gizaw, S., Haile, A., & Mekasha, Y. (2011). Population dynamics of Walia ibex (Capra walie) at Simien Mountains National Park, Ethiopia. African Journal of Ecology, 49(3), 292–300. https://doi.org/10.1111/j.1365-2028.2011.01264.x

walia ibex
Mammals of Ethiopia
Endemic fauna of Ethiopia
Fauna of the Horn of Africa
walia ibex
Ethiopian montane moorlands